Pierre-Yves Barré (17 April 1749 – 2 May 1832) was a French vaudevillist and songwriter.

Life
Barré was born in Paris. He began life as a lawyer to the French parliament, then court clerk in Pau, but as the nephew of the chansonnier Pierre Laujon moved more and more towards a life in the theatre.  With Piis, Jean-Baptiste Radet and Desfontaines-Lavallée, in 1792 he founded the théâtre du Vaudeville (which he headed until 1815, replaced by Marc-Antoine Désaugiers), then on rue de Chartres-Saint-Honoré.  Bonaparte was at first "discontented with his theatre due to anti-Republican allusions which he made every evening" but in 1805 commanded him to go to Boulogne-sur-Mer to entertain the officers of the invasion force against England. He died in Paris.

Works
 Cassandre, 1780.
 Arlequin aficheur.
 Mr. Guillaume ou le voyageur inconnu, 1800.
 Lantara ou le peintre au cabaret, 1809

References

French theatre managers and producers
1749 births
1832 deaths
Writers from Paris
18th-century French dramatists and playwrights
19th-century French dramatists and playwrights
French chansonniers